9/11: One Day in America is an American documentary television miniseries directed by Daniel Bogado and produced by Caroline Marsden. The series follows the September 11 attacks through archival footage, eyewitnesses, and survivors. The series consists of six episodes and premiered on National Geographic.

Plot 
The series follows the terrorist attacks through archival footage, eyewitnesses, survivors, with new footage never seen before.

Episodes

Production 
In May 2020, it was announced National Geographic had ordered a 6-episode documentary limited series revolving around the 9/11 terrorist attacks with Dan Lindsay, T. J. Martin and David Glover set to serve as executive producers. Production companies involved in the series include 72 Films and the 9/11 Memorial Museum.

Release 
The series had its world premiere at the Tribeca Film Festival on June 11, 2021. It was screened at the Sheffield Doc/Fest on June 13, 2021. It was also screened at AFI Docs on June 24, 2021.

Reception

Critical response 
John Anderson of The Wall Street Journal described the series as a "tour de force", adding: "The series is deliberately, painstakingly, enthrallingly thorough—so much so that the impact of the second plane into the south tower doesn’t occur until halfway through the feature-length opener." David Sexton of New Statesman wrote: "However much you have watched footage of, or read about, the attacks, it forces you to endure the day as never before; to experience it more directly, in greater detail." Melanie McFarland of Salon wrote: "By having subjects speak directly into the camera, the filmmakers create an intimacy between the survivors and the viewers that makes is easier to bear witness and relive that nightmare with them and for them."

Viewing figures

References

External links 
 

2021 American television series debuts
2021 American television series endings
2020s American crime television series
2020s American television miniseries
English-language television shows
National Geographic (American TV channel) original programming
Television series set in 2001
Films about high-rise fires